is one of three wards of Shizuoka, Shizuoka, Japan, located in the southern part of the city. The north east of Suruga-ku faces Aoi-ku; the north west faces Shimizu-ku; the south west faces Yaizu city and south east faces Suruga Bay.

Suruga-ku was created on April 1, 2005 when Shizuoka became a city designated by government ordinance (a "designated city"). It consists of the area of Shizuoka prior to its merger with Shimizu, south of the Tōkaidō Main Line rail tracks. As of 1 December 2019, Suruga-ku had a population of 210,684, with a land area of 73.06 km² and a population density of 2,884 persons per km².

Education

It has a North Korean school, Shizuoka Korean Elementary and Junior High School (静岡朝鮮初中級学校).

References

 

Wards of Shizuoka (city)